Maciel Sousa Santos (born 5 September 1985) is a Brazilian boccia player. 

Santos started playing boccia at the age of eleven and was already competing internationally at fourteen. He trains daily for six to eight hours. At the 2012 Summer Paralympics in London, he won the gold medal by defeating Yan Zhiqiang in the Individual BC2 event. At the 2020 Summer Paralympics in Tokyo, he won the bronze medal in the same event.

References 

1985 births
Living people
Sportspeople from Ceará
Paralympic medalists in boccia
Boccia players at the 2012 Summer Paralympics
Boccia players at the 2016 Summer Paralympics
Boccia players at the 2020 Summer Paralympics
Medalists at the 2012 Summer Paralympics
Medalists at the 2020 Summer Paralympics
Paralympic boccia players of Brazil
Paralympic gold medalists for Brazil
Paralympic bronze medalists for Brazil
21st-century Brazilian people